Weberbauerocereus is a genus of ceroid cactus, considered to be intermediate between the genera Trichocereus and Cleistocactus. The genus is named after August Weberbauer because of his extensive research in the Peruvian Andes.

Species
Species include:

References 

 
Cactoideae genera
Cacti of South America
Flora of Peru
Flora of the Andes